Mahmud Ali may refer to:

 Mahmud Ali (statesman) (1919–2006), Pakistani politician
 Mahmud Ali (village) (also Romanized as Maḩmūd ʿAlī), a village in Mazu Rural District, Alvar-e Garmsiri District, Andimeshk County, Khuzestan Province, Iran
 Kalateh-ye Mahmud Ali (also Romanized as Kalāteh-ye Maḩmūd ‘Alī; also known as Maḩmūd ‘Alī and Mahmood Ali), a village in Meyghan Rural District, in the Central District of Nehbandan County, South Khorasan Province, Iran

See also
 Mehmood Ali (disambiguation)